Hybosidella is a genus of spiders in the Palpimanidae family. It was first described in 2017 by Zonstein & Marusik. , it contains only one species, Hybosidella etinde, found in Cameroon.

References

Endemic fauna of Cameroon
Palpimanidae
Monotypic Araneomorphae genera
Spiders of Africa